Carlo Bozzoni (c. 1605–1657) was an Italian painter of the Baroque period. He trained with his father, the painter and engraver, Luciano Bozzoni.

References

1600s births
1657 deaths
17th-century Italian painters
Italian male painters
Italian Baroque painters